Mihai Trăistariu (born December 16, 1979 in Constanța, Romania), also known as simply Mihai (stylized as M I H A I or MIHAI), is a Romanian singer and songwriter. He is best known for representing Romania at the Eurovision Song Contest 2006 held in Athens, Greece, where he placed 4th with his song, "Tornerò". The track gained commercial success, selling over one million units worldwide and influencing the trajectory of Trăistariu's career.

Career 
Trăistariu comes from an artistic family. His father, Gheorghe Trăistariu, was a well-known painter of Piatra Neamț, while his mother, Natalia Trăistariu, studied medicine and sang in her youth. Trăistariu has three siblings: Geanina, Constantin and Vasile Trăistariu. All four play a musical instrument, with Mihai playing the piano. Trăistariu studied piano for 10 years with a private teacher and graduated from the Alexandru Ioan Cuza University in Iași with a double major in mathematics and informatics, as well as from the Theatre University in Constanța and the National College Petru Rareș in Piatra Neamț, but chose to pursue a music career. When he was 16 years old, Trăistariu began to take lessons in acting and directing with Romanian actor Corneliu Dan Borcia, the manager of Teatrul Tineretului, the Youth Theater in Piatra Neamț. He joined the jazz courses of the Student House in Iaşi, led by Romanian composer and teacher Romeo Cozma.

In 2006, Trăistariu was chosen to represent Romania in the Eurovision Song Contest 2006 with his song "Tornerò", placing fourth in the Grand Final. Trăistariu is one of the few male singers in the world that has a five-octave range, earning him the nickname "the male Mariah Carey".

Selecția Națională participations
Trăistariu has competed nine times in the Selecția Națională, a pre-selection show to select Romania's entrant for the Eurovision Song Contest. He won the competition in 2006, while placing second in 2017 and in 2000 with his then-band Valahia.

Discography

Studio albums

Singles

As lead artist

As featured artist

References

External links 
 
 
Eurodance Contest

1979 births
Living people
People from Piatra Neamț
Eurovision Song Contest entrants for Romania
Eurovision Song Contest entrants of 2006
Italian-language singers
Countertenors
Alexandru Ioan Cuza University alumni
21st-century Romanian male singers
21st-century Romanian singers